Limobius is a genus of beetles belonging to the family Curculionidae.

The species of this genus are found in Europe.

Species:
 Limobius arvernus Tempère, 1972 
 Limobius borealis (Paykull, 1792)

References

Curculionidae
Curculionidae genera